Mega TV was Malaysia's first ever subscription-based pay television service. It was incorporated on 18 October 1994 and began transmissions on 1 November 1995 and was operated by Sistem Televisyen Malaysia Berhad (STMB). It failed to break into the pay television market, and shut down in 2001.

Mega TV was transmitted from its headquarters in Bandar Utama, in the northern fringes of Petaling Jaya, Selangor.

History 
Cableview Services Sdn Bhd or Mega TV was incorporated on 18 October 1994 by a consortium which consisted of Sistem Televisyen Malaysia Berhad, Minister of Finance Incorporated, Eurocrest Sdn Bhd, Ibex TV (M) Sdn Bhd and Sri Utara Sdn Bhd.

Cable-based transmissions was officially inaugurated by the 4th Prime Minister of Malaysia, Tun Doctor Mahathir Bin Mohamad and broadcasts from Petaling Jaya on 1 November 1995 through a microwave-based broadcast system

Faced with stiff competition from the Astro satellite television network which was launched seven months later, combined with the failures to expand its content, Mega TV ceased transmission in 2001 as a result, leaving Astro as the one and only pay-TV service provider in Malaysia.

Channel listing 
This is correct as of 2001 just before Mega TV's closure:

References

External links 
 Official site of Mega TV 

1995 establishments in Malaysia
2001 disestablishments in Malaysia
Television in Malaysia
Defunct television networks
Pay television
Television channels and stations disestablished in 2001
Television channels and stations established in 1995
Mass media in Petaling Jaya